Cynorhinella bella, the Western Longnose, is a species of hoverfly in the family Syrphidae.

Description
Length 10 mm. Male. 
Head
"Face chestnut brown, concave below the antennae  with a prominent rounded tubercle about the middle, below which it is slightly  produced to the not prominent oral margin ; side margins well defined, as in  Chilosia, the facial slopes with fine whitish pollen, the side margins with sparse  whitish pile ; cheeks and frontal triangle shining, concolorous with the face ;  vertical triangle brown, the sides of the triangle about equal, with brown pile ;  occiput shining chestnut, with whitish pile below and brownish above. "
Thorax 
" shining blueblack, the dorsum with yellow pile, which is intermixed with black  on the middle, and black pile on the borders; pleurae yellowish brown, with yel-  lowish pile, the pile black above. Scutellum concolorous with dorsum, with  slightly longer black pile. " 
"Abdomen narrow, and gradually narrowing after  the second segment, in color shining blue-black, the posterior margins of the  second and third segments a little more blackish on the median two-thirds ;  hypopygium black. Pile of abdomen yellowish on basal angles, becoming white  en the hypopygium, and black on the ends of the second and third segments."
"Legs chestnut brown. Wings distinctly luteous (light to medium greenish tinge) ; stigma yellowish. Squamae  and halteres white." from Williston

Distribution
Canada, United States. (See range map.)

References

Eristalinae
Insects described in 1882
Diptera of North America
Hoverflies of North America
Taxa named by Samuel Wendell Williston